Crambus silvella is a species of moth of the family Crambidae. It is found in Europe.

Differs from Crambus pascuella as follows : forewings with apex little produced, dorsum less whitish, median streak less broad, continued beyond second line to termen, costal spot before second line much more elongate.

References

Bibliography

External links

 waarneming.nl 
 Crambus silvella at UKmoths

Crambini
Moths described in 1813
Moths of Europe